Donald Duck's Playground is a 1984 Sierra educational game. The player takes the role of Donald Duck, whose job is to earn money so that he can buy playground items for his nephews. To do this, Donald can get himself a job in any of four different work places. Each job shift lasts from one to eight minutes, as the player wants, in which time Donald has to earn as much as he can.

Donald Duck's Playground was originally written for the Commodore 64 and subsequently ported to Sierra's AGI interpreter for the Apple II, PC compatibles, Amiga, and Atari ST. A version for the TRS-80 Color Computer followed as well.

The jobs
Donald has a different task at each job. He earns a set amount for each part of his job; on the Intermediate level, these wages are doubled; on the Advanced level, these wages are tripled.

The greengrocer's: Donald is responsible for sorting vegetables thrown to him from the back of a pick-up truck in three different boxes. One of the boxes is for watermelons, one is for pumpkins, and one is for cantaloupes. Each vegetable gets thrown at a randomly chosen distance. Donald has to catch it and put it in the correct box. Failing to catch the vegetable or putting it in the wrong box results in it being squashed and no money earned. Donald earns 1 cent for each vegetable correctly sorted.
The toy shop: Donald is responsible for putting toys given to him from a conveyor belt in the correct place on a shelf. Every 80 seconds or so, a train will pass on a nearby railroad. If the shelf is open at the time, the train will cause toys to drop from the shelf, losing money. Donald has to close the shelf for the time the train is coming. Donald earns 5 cents for each toy placed on the shelf.
The railroad: Donald is at a switch console, responsible for putting switches on the tracks in the correct order, so that cargo trains can pick their cargo up from the correct cars and deliver it to the correct city. Donald earns 15 cents for each delivery routed.
The airport: Donald is responsible for sorting cargo given to him on a conveyor belt into the cargo vans for flights. Each item of cargo bears the three-letter abbreviation of some U.S. airport. Donald has to throw it into a passing cargo van with the matching code. Near the end, the aeroplane leaves, and Donald has to stop sorting cargo. Donald earns 3 cents for each item sorted.

The playground
Donald can spend his hard-earned wages by buying various items such as ladders and swings for a playground his nephews can play at. They can be bought from three different stores where the player must be able to count the amount of coins and bills needed for an item and, if the total is not even, the change.

Each item bought is placed at a specific place on the playground. By going across the railroad, Donald can call up one of his nephews (in practice, the player character switches from Donald to his nephew), and he can then play on the playground.

Reception 
Abandonware website Abandonias Sebatianos reviewed Donald Duck's Playground with "the game is more than solid for its time (great graphics, good sound, cute idea, lovable hero, etc.)".

See also
 List of Disney video games by genre

References

External links
 Donald Duck's Playground at Atari Mania
 
 Donald Duck's Playground at '80s DOS Games
 Donald Duck's Playground at AlLowe.com

1984 video games
Amiga games
Atari ST games
Apple II games
Children's educational video games
Commodore 64 games
Donald Duck video games
ScummVM-supported games
Sierra Entertainment games
U.S. Gold games
Video games scored by Al Lowe
Video games developed in the United States